Vahana (or animal vehicle, literally "that which carries, that which pulls") denotes the being, typically an animal or mythical, a particular Hindu God is said to use as a vehicle. In this capacity, the vahana is often called the deity's "mount". Upon the partnership between the deity and his vahana is woven much iconography and Hindu theology. Deities are often depicted riding (or simply mounted upon) the vahana. Other times, the vahana is depicted at the deity's side or symbolically represented as a divine attribute. The vahana may be considered an accoutrement of the deity: though the vahana may act independently, they are still functionally emblematic or even syntagmatic of their "rider". The deity may be seen sitting or standing on the vahana. They may be sitting on a small platform, or riding on a saddle or bareback.

Etymology 
Vah in Sanskrit means to carry, or transport.

Symbolism
In Hindu iconography, positive aspects of the vehicle are often emblematic of the deity that it carries. Nandi the bull, vehicle of Shiva, represents strength and virility. Dinka the mouse, vehicle of Ganesha, represents speed and sharpness. Parvani the peacock, vehicle of Kartikeya, represents splendor and majesty. The hamsa, vehicle of Saraswati, represents wisdom, grace, and beauty.

However, the vehicle animal also symbolizes the evil forces over which the deity dominates. Mounted on Parvani, Kartikeya reins in the peacock's vanity. Seated on Dinka the rat (Mushika), Ganesha crushes useless thoughts, which multiply like rats in the dark. Shani, protector of property, has a vulture, raven, or crow within whom he represses thieving tendencies. Under Shani's influence, the vahana can make even malevolent events bring hope.

Examples

Garuda 
Garuda, and his story of becoming the mount of Vishnu, is richly detailed in Hindu texts. Born to Vinata and bearing the power of Kashyapa's penance, the demigod is anguished to find that his mother is enslaved by the cruel Kadru. When he pleaded with Kadru to free his mother, the latter demanded the nectar of immortality as the price of her liberty. His legend of securing amrita, the nectar of immortality, is described in the episode known as Amṛtakalaśāpaharaṇam:

Mushika 
While the god Ganesha was still a child, a giant mouse began to terrorize all his friends. Ganesha trapped him with his lasso and made him his mount. Mushika was originally a gandharva, or celestial musician. After absent mindedly walking over the feet of a rishi (sage) named Vamadeva, Mushika was cursed and transformed into a mouse. However, after the rishi recovered his temper, he promised Mushika that one day, the gods themselves would bow down before him. The prophecy was fulfilled when the mouse became the vahana of Ganesha.

Nandi 
Before becoming the vehicle of Shiva, Nandi was a deity called Nandikeshvara, lord of joy and master of music and dance. Then, without warning, his name and his functions were transferred to the aspect of Shiva known as the deity Nataraja. From half-man, half-bull, he became simply a bull. Since that time, he has watched over each of Shiva's temples, always looking towards him.

Paravani 
Kartikeya, the war-god known as Murugan in Southern India, is mounted on a peacock named Paravani. This peacock was originally a demon called Surapadma, while the rooster was called the angel [Krichi]. After provoking Murugan in combat, the demon repented at the moment his lance descended upon him. He took the form of a tree and began to pray. The tree was cut in two. From one half, Murugan pulled a rooster, which he made his emblem, and from the other, a peacock, which he made his mount. In another version, Karthikeya was born to kill the demon, Tarakasura. He was raised by the Krittikas and led the divine armies when he was 6 days old. It is said that after defeating Tarakasura, the god forgave him and transformed him into his ride, the peacock.

Compared to other belief systems
The animal correspondences of Hindu vehicles are not consistent with Greek and Roman mythology, or other belief systems which may tie a particular animal to a particular deity. For example, the goddess Lakshmi of the Hindus has elephants, or an owl, or (a rare instance of a non-animal vehicle) the lotus blossom as her vehicle. The goddess Athena of ancient Greece also had an owl as her emblematic familiar, but the meanings invested in the owls by the two different belief systems are not the same, nor are the two goddesses themselves similar, despite their mutual identification with owls.

Lakshmi is, among other things, primarily the goddess of wealth, and her owl is a warning against distrust and isolationism, even selfishness. Athena, though also a goddess of prosperity, is primarily the goddess of wisdom, and her owl symbolizes secret knowledge and scholarship. Perhaps due to their shared geography, the Greco-Roman interpretation is paralleled in Roman Catholic iconography, in which St. Jerome, most famed for editing the New Testament, is often (though not always) depicted with an owl as a symbol of wisdom and scholarship. Depending on the tribe, Native American religious iconography attributes a wide range of attributes to the owl, both positive and negative, as do the Ainu and Russian cultures, but none parallel the Hindu attributes assigned to the owl as Lakshmi's divine vehicle.

Some hold that similar analyses could be performed cross-culturally for any of the other Hindu divine vehicles, and in each case, any parallels with the values assigned to animal totems in other cultures are likely to be either coincidence, or inevitable (as in linking bulls to virility), rather than evidence of parallel development. In dialectic, this is countered by the retort that each totem or vahana, as an aspect of ishta-devata (or an ishta-devata or asura in its own right), has innumerable ineffable teachings, insights and spiritual wisdom; comparative analysis yields benefit, though knowledge and understanding is not served by collapsing their qualities into homogenous signification.

List of Vahanas 

These correspondences are not always consistent. Ganesha, for example, is sometimes shown with a peacock as his vehicle. Even more rarely, the elephant-headed Ganesh may be seen riding an elephant, or a lion, or a many-headed serpent (See Ganesha's Vahanas).

The vahana, the mount or vehicle of a deity, serves the function of doubling a deity's powers. The vahana also represents the devotee's mind which allows the deity to guide the devotee. Durga the warrioress could not have destroyed the demon Mahishasura without the aid of her vehicle, lion, which was given by her father Himalaya, for the stated purpose. Lakshmi, goddess of fortune, dispenses both material and spiritual riches from her mount, Uluka the owl. Ganesha, remover of obstacles, cannot go everywhere despite his elephant-like strength. However, his vehicle, Mushika the mouse, who can crawl into the smallest crevice or Akhuketana the rat, who can survive just about anywhere, can assist Ganesha to overcome the greatest obstacles.

See also
 Hindu deities
 Hindu iconography
 Hindu mythology
 List of Hindu deities

Notes

External links

 Holy Vehicles, an illustrated list. Accessed August 10, 2007.
 Hindu Deities and Their Vehicles, a partial list at About.Com. Accessed August 10, 2007.
 Symbolism of the Vehicles of Gods and Goddesses. Accessed August 10, 2007.

Hindu deities
Hindu iconography
Animals in Hinduism
Hindu legendary creatures